The 2016 Tennis Classic of Macon was a professional tennis tournament played on outdoor hard courts. It was the 4th edition of the tournament and part of the 2016 ITF Women's Circuit, offering a total of $50,000 in prize money. It took place in Macon, Georgia, United States, on 24–30 October 2016.

Singles main draw entrants

Seeds 

 1 Rankings as of 17 October 2016.

Other entrants 
The following player received a wildcard into the singles main draw:
  Alexa Guarachi
  Danielle Lao
  Sabrina Santamaria
  Jessica Wacnik

The following players received entry from the qualifying draw:
  Emina Bektas
  Danielle Collins
  Alexandra Mueller
  Ingrid Neel

The following player received entry by a lucky loser spot:
  Ronit Yurovsky

Champions

Singles

 Kayla Day def.  Danielle Collins, 6–1, 6–3

Doubles

 Michaëlla Krajicek /  Taylor Townsend def.  Sabrina Santamaria /  Keri Wong, 3–6, 6–2, [10–6]

External links 
 2016 Tennis Classic of Macon at ITFtennis.com
 Official website

2016 ITF Women's Circuit
2016 in American tennis
Tennis tournaments in the United States